Samantha Barbash is an American entrepreneur and former adult entertainment host whose real life story with Roselyn Keo formed the basis for the movie Hustlers, starring Jennifer Lopez and Constance Wu. The film was adapted from Jessica Pressler's 2015 article in New York magazine, "The Hustlers at Scores".  Barbash has written her own memoirs, entitled Underscore.

Known professionally as Samantha Foxx, she became an adult entertainment host at 19 and later a hostess at Scores Gentlemen's Club in the Chelsea neighbourhood of Manhattan and in the same borough's Hustlers Club. Many of their biggest spending clients were highly paid Wall Street brokers.

Barbash was on probation for five years after pleading guilty of conspiracy, assault and grand larceny. Following her conviction, Barbash opened a spa offering cosmetic procedures and plastic surgery.

See also
 Diane Passage

References

Year of birth missing (living people)
Living people
American businesspeople
American sex workers
American women writers